Celestus barbouri, also known commonly as Barbour's galliwasp and the limestone forest galliwasp, is a species of lizard in the family Diploglossidae. The species is endemic to Jamaica.

Etymology
The specific name, barbouri, is in honor of American herpetologist Thomas Barbour.

Geographic range
C. barbouri is found in central and northern Jamaica.

Habitat

Description

Reproduction
C. barbouri is ovoviviparous.

References

Further reading
Grant C (1940). "The Herpetology of Jamaica II. The Reptiles". Bulletin of the Institute of Jamaica, Science Series (1): 61–148. (Celestus barbouri, new species, p. 101).
Schools M, Hedges SB (2021). "Phylogenetics, classification, and biogeography of the Neotropical forest lizards (Squamata, Diploglossidae)". Zootaxa 4974 (2): 201–257.
Schwartz A, Henderson RW (1991). Amphibians and Reptiles of the West Indies: Descriptions, Distributions, and Natural History. Gainesville: University of Florida Press. 720 pp. . (Celestus barbouri, p. 367).
Schwartz A, Thomas R (1975). A Check-list of West Indian Amphibians and Reptiles. Carnegie Museum of Natural History Special Publication No. 1. Pittsburgh, Pennsylvania: Carnegie Museum of Natural History. 216 pp. (Diploglossus barbouri, p. 114).

Celestus
Reptiles described in 1940
Reptiles of Jamaica
Endemic fauna of Jamaica
Taxa named by Chapman Grant